"Snap Out of It" is a song by English indie rock band Arctic Monkeys from their fifth studio album, AM. The song was released as the album's sixth overall single on 9 June 2014, impacting contemporary hit radio in the United Kingdom.

Music video
The music video was directed by Focus Creeps and was released on 16 June 2014. Stephanie Sigman portrays the featured character.

Critical reception

Mic Wright of The Quietus wrote the song "has clicks, claps and the kind of catchy hooks that'll get you a job pumping out new songs for Icona Pop".

Personnel
Arctic Monkeys
Alex Turner – lead vocals, rhythm guitar, keyboards
Jamie Cook – lead guitar
Nick O'Malley – bass guitar, backing vocals
Matt Helders – drums, backing vocals
Additional personnel
James Ford – production

Charts

Certifications

Release history

References

2013 songs
2014 singles
Arctic Monkeys songs
Domino Recording Company singles
Jangle pop songs
Songs written by Alex Turner (musician)